Ultrasonic antifouling is a technology that uses high frequency sound (ultrasound) to prevent or reduce biofouling on underwater structures, surfaces, and medium. Ultrasound is just high frequency sound (which humans can not hear). Ultrasound has the same physical properties as human-audible sound. The method has two primary forms: sub-cavitation intensity and cavitation intensity. Sub-cavitation methods create high frequency vibrations, whilst cavitation methods cause more destructive microscopic pressure changes. Both methods inhibit or prevent biofouling by algae and other single-celled organisms.

Background
Ultrasound was discovered in 1794 when Italian physiologist and biologist Lazzarro Spallanzani discovered that bats navigate through the reflection of high frequency sounds. Ultrasonic antifouling is believed to have been discovered by the US Navy in the 1950s. During sonar tests on submarines, it is said that the areas surrounding the sonar transducers had less fouling than the rest of the hull .

Antifouling (the removal of biofouling) has been attempted since ancient times, initially using wax, tar or asphalt. Copper and lead sheathings were later introduced by Phoenicians and Carthaginians." The Cutty Sark is one example of such copper sheathing, available to view in Greenwich, England.

Theory

Ultrasound 

Ultrasound (ultrasonic) is sound at a frequency high enough that humans can not hear it. Sound has a frequency (low to high) and an intensity (quiet to loud).

Ultrasound is used to clean jewellery, weld rubber, treat abscesses, and sonography. These applications rely on the interaction of sound with the media through which the sound travels. In maritime applications, ultrasound is the key ingredient in sonar; sonar relies on sound at frequences ranging from infrasonic to ultrasonic.

Biofilm 
The three main stages are formation of a conditioning biofilm, microfouling and macrofouling. A biofilm is the accretion of single-celled organisms on a surface. This creates a habitat that enables other organisms to establish themselves. The conditioning film collects living and dead bacteria, creating the so-called the primary film.

Ultrasonic antifouling 
The two approaches to ultrasonic antifouling are:

Cavitation: Ultrasound of high enough intensity causes water to boil, creating cavitation. This physically annihilates living organizsm and the supporting biofilm. One concern is to the potential effect on the hull. Cavitation can be predicted mathematically through the calculation of acoustic pressure. Where this pressure is low enough, the liquid can reach its vaporisation pressure. Such systems are more appropriate where power consumption is not a factor, and the surfaces-to-be-protected can tolerate the forces involved.

Sub-cavitation: The sound vibrates the surfaces (e.g. hull, sea chests, water coolers) to which the transducer is attached. The vibrations prevent the cyprid stage of the biofouling species from attaching themselves permanently to the substrate by disrupting the Van Der Waals Force that allow their microvilli to hold themselves to the surface . 

Different frequencies and intensities (or power) of ultrasonic waves have varying effects on marine life, such as barnacles, mussels and algae.

Components 
The two main components of an ultrasonic antifouling system are:
 Transducer: The speaker or transducer takes an electrical signal and vibrates the medium in which it is located at the frequencies in the signal. The transducer is in direct contact with the hull or other surfaces, causing them to propagate the sound. Hull materials such as concrete and wood do not provide good antifouling since they contain many voids that dissipate/absorb the sound.

 Control Unit: The sound source and amplifier that provides the signals and power to each transducer. A single control box might control multiple transducers with either the same signal or varied signals.

Applications
Commercial systems are available in a wide range of energies and configurations. All use ceramic piezoelectric transducers as the sound source. Dedicated systems support:

 Ship hull protection (to prevent fouling, increase speed and reduce fuel costs)
 Heat exchanger protection (to extend operational cycles between cleaning)
 Water intakes (to prevent blockages)
 Fuel tanks (to prevent diesel contamination)
 Offshore structures (such as wind farms, oil and gas installations etc.)
 HVAC Cooling Towers to reduce or eliminate chemical dosing treatments

Limitations

Surface Cleaning 
Ultrasonic antifouling systems are generally only capable of maintaining a clean surface. They can't clean a surface that already has a well established and mature biofouling infestation. To this end, they are a preventative measure with the goal of an ultrasonic antifouling system being to maintain the protected surface as close to its optimum clean state as possible.

Hull materials 
Ultrasonic systems are ineffective on wooden-hulled vessels, or vessels made from ferro-cement as these materials dampen the vibrations.from the transducers. Composite hulls with a sandwich construction may also require modification to form monolithic plinths of solid material at each transducer location.

References

Fouling